Union Sportive Marseille Endoume Catalans is a French association football team founded in 1925. They are based in Marseille, France, and play at the 6th level of French football. They play at the Stade le Cesne in Marseille, which has a capacity of 3,500.

Endoume reached the 1/16-finals of the 1987–88 Coupe de France, losing 6–3 to La Roche VF on aggregate. The club also reached the 1/32-finals of the 1995–96 Coupe de France, where they played local rivals Olympique de Marseille.

Current squad

References

Marseille Endoume
1925 establishments in France
Football clubs in Marseille